Treffen is a market town in the district of Villach-Land in Carinthia in south-central Austria.

Geography
The municipality lies about 8 km north of Villach.

References

Cities and towns in Villach-Land District